Marshal of the Realm may refer to:
Marshal of the Realm (Denmark)
Marshal of the Realm (Sweden)
Reichsmarschall

See also